The Zula Patrol is an American animated television series produced by Kambooteron Productions, Gotham Entertainment and The Hatchery and distributed by American Public Television to PBS Kids in the United States.

Characters

The Zula Patrol
Bula (Cam Clarke) 
Zeeter (Colleen O'Shaughnessey) 
Multo (Cam Clarke) His voice is based on that of legendary comedian Ed Wynn.
Wizzy and Wigg (Colleen O'Shaughnessey and Nika Futterman) 
Gorga

Villains
Dark Truder (Kurt Kelly). He also does a number of disguises including cross-dressing as Madame Luna.
Traxie (Colleen O'Shaughnessey)
Deliria (Colleen O'Shaughnessey) 
Cloid (Dave Wittenberg)

Episodes

Season 1 (2005–06; 2014)
NOTE: In 2014, every episode was re-aired, but on weekdays instead of Sundays.

Season 2 (2007)
NOTE: Starting with this season, episodes would air weekdays instead of weekly.

Season 3 (2008)

Awards
2006: Nominated Annie Award for best music in an Animated Television Production: Jeff Danna, for episode "Case of the Missing Rings".

Voice cast

Other media 
Mission Weather Mission Weather was a traveling exhibition in which Captain Bula, Professor Multo, Space Pilot Zeeter, flying wonders Wizzy and Wigg, and Space Pet Gorga invite you to a hands-on, interactive exhibit to learn all about clouds, precipitation, wind, temperature, and other weather phenomena.

References 

 
 Zula hits movie theaters for one-time showing (February 27, 2008) at KidScreen
 "Zula Patrol creator prioritized fun" Los Angeles Times May 10, 2009

2000s American animated television series
2000s American science fiction television series
2005 American television series debuts
2008 American television series endings
American children's animated space adventure television series
American children's animated science fantasy television series
American children's animated education television series
American computer-animated television series
Animated television series about extraterrestrial life
English-language television shows
PBS Kids shows
PBS original programming